John Hough (born 21 November 1941) is a British film and television director. He is primarily known for his suspense films of the 1970s and 1980s, including Twins of Evil (1971), The Legend of Hell House (1973), The Incubus (1982) and American Gothic (1988), as well as the 1974 action thriller Dirty Mary, Crazy Larry.

Career

British TV
After many credits as a second unit director on The Baron, The Avengers and The Champions, Hough took his first job as a director on the 1968 season of The Avengers, directing episodes such as "Super Secret Cypher Snatch" and "Homicide and Old Lace".

"ITC was a very special place to work in", he said later. "And the people cared. Instead of asking you to do it quicker and with less quality, they'd push you to excel yourself. It was creative and interesting, but very disciplined. It was like Michelangelo painting the Sistine Chapel on a nine-to-five contract."

British films
Hough's TV work led to a TV pilot for a proposed Robin Hood TV show, Wolfshead: The Legend of Robin Hood in 1969. Even though the series never materialised, the pilot was picked up by Hammer Films, which distributed it theatrically.

"That one sank without trace", Hough recalled in the notes for his biography on the DVD of his 1980 film The Watcher in the Woods, "but in 1970 a Hollywood producer named Paul Maslanksy came over here looking for a new director to work on a remake of The Window (1949), in which a young boy is the sole witness to a murder and is then tracked down by the assassin."

The film Eyewitness (1970) was well received; Hammer then approached him to make the final film in its erotic vampire horror 'Karnstein' trilogy, Twins of Evil (1971).

Hollywood Career
Hough moved to Hollywood with the intention of making inroads to direct for Disney. While doing so, a new production company, Academy Pictures Corporation (started by former American International Pictures partner, James H. Nicholson), hired Hough to direct the low-budget action picture Dirty Mary, Crazy Larry.  The film was very successful in the summer of 1974, and helped open the doors to Disney, where Hough directed Escape to Witch Mountain which was successful and Watcher In The Woods.

Return to Britain
Hough later directed three of the TV movies in the 1984 anthology series Hammer House of Mystery and Suspense.

He directed a series of films based on Barbara Cartland novels starting with A Hazard of Hearts.

He also directed Something to Believe In (1998) for Lew Grade.

Filmography

Unmade films
The Fan Club (1974) – for Lawrence Gordon at Columbia Pictures based on novel by Irwin Wallace.
Poe – about Edgar Allan Poe (1976)

References

External links

 
 
John Hough profile at Den of Geek
 

1941 births
Living people
Film directors from London